HPN may refer to:

 Hapton railway station, England
 Higgs prime, 
 HPN (gene)
 Quaternionic projective space, 
 Westchester County Airport, White Plains, New York, United States